Zájezdec is a municipality and village in Chrudim District in the Pardubice Region of the Czech Republic. It has about 100 inhabitants.

References

External links

Villages in Chrudim District